Alys Conran is a Welsh writer. Her debut novel Pigeon won the Wales Book of the Year in 2017.

Early life 
Alys Conran was born in north-west Wales, and is the daughter of the poet and translator Tony Conran. She studied literature in Edinburgh before completing an MA in creative writing at Manchester.

Career 
Conran's first novel Pigeon was published by Parthian Books in 2016. A Welsh language adaptation by Siân Northey was published at the same time as the English original, making it the first fiction novel to be simultaneously published in English and Welsh. At the 2017 Wales Book of the Year Awards, the English-language version of Pigeon won the overall prize for Wales Book of the Year, as well as the Wales Arts Review People's Choice Award and the Rhys Davies Trust Fiction Award. It was also shortlisted for the Dylan Thomas Prize and longlisted for the Author's Choice First Novel Award. 

In 2018, Conran's second novel Dignity was picked up by Weidenfeld & Nicolson, and published in April 2019. Dignity was shortlisted for the Wales Book of the Year award in 2020.

Bibliography

Novels 

 Pigeon (2016)
 Dignity (2019)

References 

Year of birth missing (living people)
Living people
21st-century Welsh women writers
21st-century Welsh writers
Welsh novelists